The École Nationale des Sciences Appliquées d'Agadir is a public engineering school of the Ibn Zohr University in Agadir, Morocco. Its mission is to train state engineers of multidisciplinary nature.

Located in Agadir, it is part of the network of ENSA.

Academic
Seven engineering courses are offered:
Computer engineering
Industrial engineering
Engineering Processes for Energy and the Environment
Mechanical engineering
Electrical engineering
Financial engineering 
Civil engineering

External links
  Site officiel de l'ENSA d'Agadir

Education in Morocco
Buildings and structures in Agadir